Eric Thornton (5 July 1883 – 26 November 1945) was a footballer who competed in the 1900 Olympic Games. Born in England, he represented the Belgium national team. In Paris he won a bronze medal as a member of Université de Bruxelles club team.

References

External links

1883 births
1945 deaths
Sportspeople from Worthing
Belgian footballers
English footballers
Association football forwards
Belgium international footballers
Olympic bronze medalists for Belgium
Olympic footballers of Belgium
Medalists at the 1900 Summer Olympics
Footballers at the 1900 Summer Olympics
Olympic medalists in football
K. Beerschot V.A.C. players
English expatriate footballers
English expatriate sportspeople in Belgium
Expatriate footballers in Belgium
English people of Belgian descent